In 1951 Billboard magazine published three charts covering the best-performing country music songs in the United States: Most-Played Juke Box (Country & Western) Records, Best-Selling Retail Folk (Country & Western) Records and Country & Western Records Most Played By Folk Disk Jockeys.  The juke box chart was compiled based on a "weekly survey among a selected group of jukebox operators whose locations require country and western records", the best sellers chart based on a "survey among a selected group of retail stores, the majority of whose customers purchase country and western records", and the jockeys chart based on a "weekly survey among a select list of over 400 disk jockeys specializing in country and western tunes".  The juke box chart would be discontinued in 1957 and the other two charts merged in 1958 to form a multimetric chart, which has been published weekly since that date and since 2005 has been entitled Hot Country Songs.

In the first issue of Billboard of 1951, each chart had a different number one, although two were by the same artist.  Lefty Frizzell was atop both the juke box and jockeys charts, with "If You've Got the Money I've Got the Time" and "I Love You a Thousand Ways" respectively, while the best sellers chart was headed by Hank Snow with "The Golden Rocket".  During the year, each of the three charts had a song spend more than ten consecutive weeks at number one: Frizzell had an unbroken run of eleven weeks in the top spot of the best sellers chart with "Always Late (with Your Kisses)" and had a similar run at number one on the jockeys chart with "I Want to Be with You Always".  The longest run at number one on any of the charts, however, was the fourteen consecutive weeks which Tennessee Ernie spent atop the juke box chart with "Shotgun Boogie".  Frizzell reached number one for the first time in late 1950 and achieved five chart-toppers within 18 months, but soon afterwards his chart performance began to decline, his career suffering in part due to issues in his personal life.  He was the only artist with four number-one country songs in 1951; Snow and Eddy Arnold each had three.  Hank Williams had two number ones on the jockeys chart, but none on either of the other two charts.

Two artists reached number one for the first time in 1951.  Carl Smith spent a single week in December atop the jockeys chart with his first number one, "Let Old Mother Nature Have Her Way", although the song would return to the top spot, and also top the best sellers and juke box charts, in 1952.  Smith, who had only entered the chart for the first time earlier in the year, would go on to reach the top 40 nearly 70 times over a 20-year career before he chose to retire from the music industry.  Bandleader Pee Wee King's debut chart-topper "Slow Poke", featuring his band the Golden West Cowboys and lead vocalist Redd Stewart, had lengthy runs in the top spot on all three charts in 1951, and ended the year in the number one position on all the listings.  It would, however, prove to be the only number one single for King, whose career went into decline in the mid-1950s.  Every artist to top the chart in 1951 has been inducted into the Country Music Hall of Fame, beginning with Hank Williams, who was inducted posthumously in the first group of entrants in 1961.

Chart history

a.  Two songs tied for number one on the juke box chart.

See also
List of Billboard Top Country & Western Records of 1951
1951 in country music
List of artists who reached number one on the U.S. country chart

References

1951
Country
1951 record charts